Roberto Cardinale (born 12 June 1981) is an Italian professional football player currently playing for USD Scalea 1912.

He played one game in the Serie A in the 2003/04 season for Perugia Calcio.

After the bankrupt of Gela, he signed a 2-year contract with Avellino.

References

External links
 

1981 births
Living people
Italian footballers
Italy under-21 international footballers
Serie A players
Serie B players
U.S. Salernitana 1919 players
A.C. Perugia Calcio players
Spezia Calcio players
Potenza S.C. players
A.S.D. Martina Calcio 1947 players
U.S. Avellino 1912 players
Association football defenders
Mediterranean Games silver medalists for Italy
Mediterranean Games medalists in football
Competitors at the 2001 Mediterranean Games
U.S. Agropoli 1921 players